Ferenc Nyers (also known as Étienne Nyers; born 3 March 1927) is a French retired professional footballer who played as a forward. He was active in France, Italy, Hungary and Colombia.

Early life
Nyers was born in Freyming-Merlebach, Moselle, France on 3 March 1927 to Hungarian immigrant parents. His older brother is fellow footballer István Nyers.

Career
Nyers played club football with Strasbourg, Lazio, Hungaria FbC Roma, Junior Barranquilla and Saint-Étienne.

External links
RSSSF – "Apolides" in Italy
RC Strasbourg profile

1927 births
Possibly living people
People from Freyming-Merlebach
French people of Hungarian descent
French expatriate sportspeople in Colombia
French footballers
RC Strasbourg Alsace players
AS Saint-Étienne players
French expatriate footballers
Expatriate footballers in Italy
Serie A players
Ligue 1 players
Atlético Junior footballers
S.S. Lazio players
Association football forwards
Sportspeople from Moselle (department)
Footballers from Grand Est
French expatriate sportspeople in Italy
French expatriate sportspeople in Hungary
Expatriate footballers in Hungary
Expatriate footballers in Colombia